A gastrointestinal series, also called a GI series, is a radiologic examination of the upper and/or lower gastrointestinal tract.

Upper GI series
Lower GI series